Bhagalpur - Lokmanya Tilak Terminus Superfast Express is a Superfast Express train of the Indian Railways connecting Lokmanya Tilak Terminus Kurla in Maharashtra and Bhagalpur Junction of Bihar. It is currently being operated with 12335/12236 train numbers on a Tri-Weekly basis.

Service

The 12335/Bhagalpur - Mumbai LTT SF Express has an average speed of 55 km/hr and covers 1910 km in 35 hrs. 12336/Mumbai LTT - Bhagalpur SF Express has an average speed of 56 km/hr and 1910 km in 34 hrs 55 mins.

Route and halts 

The important halts of the train are:

Coach composite

The train has standard LHB rakes with max speed of 110 kmph and average speed of 55kmph. The train consists of 22 coaches :

 2 AC II Tier
 5 AC III Tier
 9 Sleeper Coaches
 3 General
 1 Pantry Car
 1 Second-class Luggage/parcel van
 1 EOG cum Luggage Van

Traction
Both trains are hauled by an Howrah Loco Shed based WAP-4 Electric locomotive from Bhagalpur to Lokmanya Tilak Terminus and from Satna To Katni it is hauled by a Katni Loco Shed[WDM-3A]

See also 

 Lokmanya Tilak Terminus railway station
 Bhagalpur Junction railway station
 Lokmanya Tilak Terminus Darbhanga Pawan Express
 Lokmanya Tilak Terminus Muzaffarpur Pawan Express

Schedule  

12335 - Starts from Bhagalpur every Sunday, Tuesday,Friday at Morning 9:00 AM IST and reach Lokmanya Tilak Terminus on 2nd Day at Evening 8:00 PM

12336 - Starts for  Lokmanya Tilak Terminus on every Sunday,Tuesday,Thursday at Morning 8:05 AM IST and reach Bhagalpur next day at 6:30 PM  IST.

Notes

References

External links 
 12335/Bhagalpur - Mumbai LTT SF Express
 12336/Mumbai LTT - Bhagalpur SF Express

Transport in Bhagalpur
Transport in Mumbai
Express trains in India
Rail transport in Maharashtra
Rail transport in Madhya Pradesh
Rail transport in Uttar Pradesh
Rail transport in Bihar